Kacper Maciej Płażyński (born 10 May 1989) is a Polish lawyer and politician.

Biography
Kacper Płażyński is a graduate of the Faculty of Law and Administration of the University of Gdańsk. He runs his own law firm. In 2018, he was elected a councilor of Gdańsk and was the chairman of the Law and Justice Club in the Gdańsk City Council. During the 2019 Polish parliamentary election held on 13 October 2019, he was elected a Member of the Sejm for constitutency 25 - Gdańsk.

Kacper Płażyński is the son of the Polish politician Maciej Płażyński.

References

Living people
1989 births
21st-century Polish lawyers
21st-century Polish politicians
Members of the Polish Sejm 2019–2023
Jagiellonian University alumni
Law and Justice politicians
Politicians from Gdańsk
University of Gdańsk alumni